Kateřina Hejlová is a Czech former football defender who played in the Czech First Division for Slavia Prague, with which she also played the European Cup. She was a member of the Czech national team for three years.

References

1982 births
Living people
Czech women's footballers
Women's association football defenders
SK Slavia Praha (women) players
Czech Republic women's international footballers
Czech Women's First League players